Keelapavoor  (Keezhapavur) is a town located in the Tenkasi District of Tamil Nadu State, India.

Geography
It is situated at an average elevation of 158 metres (518 feet).

Demographics 
 India census,  Keelpavoor-Keezhapavur had a population of 19,958# Males constitute 50% of the population and females 50%  Keelapavoor has an average literacy rate of 67%, higher than the national average of 59#5%: male literacy is 76%, and female literacy is 57%  In Keelapavoor, 12% of the population is under 6 years of age#

References

Cities and towns in Tirunelveli district